Pray for the Sentencing is a two-disc compilation album by American death metal band Solstice. The first CD contains remastered songs from the band's first two albums, Solstice and Pray. The second disc contains remixes of the songs from Pray by guitarist Dennis Munoz.

Track listing
Tracks 1-9 are from Solstice, while tracks 10-19 are from Pray.

Personnel
Solstice
 Rob Barrett – vocals, guitar (tracks 1–1 to 1–9)
 Christian Rudes – vocals, guitar (tracks 1–10 to 1–19, 2–1 to 2–10)
 Dennis Munoz – guitar
 Mark Van Erp – bass (tracks 1–1 to 1–9)
 Garret Scott – bass (tracks 1–10 to 1–19, 2–1 to 2–10)
 Alex Marquez – drums

Production
 Solstice – mixing and production on Solstice and Pray
 Dennis Munoz – mixing and production on Pray remix
 Jamie King – mastering
 Kelly Ros – artwork
 Edward J. Repka – layout and design

References

2012 compilation albums
Solstice (American band) albums
Death metal compilation albums
Thrash metal compilation albums